Fog Investigation and Dispersal Operation (FIDO) (which was sometimes referred to as "Fog Intense Dispersal Operation" or "Fog, Intense Dispersal Of") was a system used for dispersing fog and pea soup fog (dense smog) from an airfield so that aircraft could land safely. The device was developed by Arthur Hartley for British RAF bomber stations, allowing the landing of aircraft returning from raids over Germany in poor visibility by burning fuel in rows on either side of the runway.

The FIDO system was developed at the department of chemical engineering of the University of Birmingham, United Kingdom, during the Second World War. The invention of FIDO is formally attributed to Dr John David Main-Smith, an ex-Birmingham resident and principal scientific officer of the Chemistry Department of the Royal Aircraft Establishment at Farnborough, Hampshire, and as a courtesy the joint-patent (595,907) held by the Ministry of Supply was shared by the department head Dr Ramsbottom as was normal practice at the time. This formal government recognition is enshrined in an Air Ministry postwar letter to the late inventor's late widow and held by his son, Bruce Main-Smith (February 2008). It also deals with the lesser role of those developing support equipment, notably the FIDO burner.

"It is my memory", writes Bruce Main-Smith, "that much of the airfield installation was pioneered at Hartford Bridge Flats airfield (aka Blackbushe near Yateley, Surrey ) a convenient few miles from the RAE's Farnborough aerodrome." Though J. D. Main-Smith co-owned the FIDO patent, no royalties accrued from any UK civilian usage after World War II, its being too petrol-hungry. At an attempt to quantify the saving of aircrew life, Bruce Main-Smith suggests possibly 11,000 airmen but not all would be fit to fly again.

The system
The device consisted of two pipelines situated along both sides of the runway and through which a fuel (usually the petrol from the airfield's own fuel dump) was pumped along and then out through burner jets positioned at intervals along the pipelines. The vapours were lit from a series of burners, producing walls of flame. The FIDO installation usually stored its fuel in four circular upright tanks built at the edge of the airfield with a low brick bund wall in case of leakage. The tanks were usually encased in ordinary brickwork as protection from bomb splinters or cannon fire.

When fog prevented returning Allied aircraft from locating and seeing their runways to land, they would be diverted to FIDO equipped aerodromes. RAF night bombers which were damaged on their missions were also diverted to FIDO airfields due to the need to make certain they could land when they arrived. When FIDO was needed, the fuel pumps were started to pour flammable liquid into the pipe system and a Jeep with a flaming brand lashed to its rear drove fast down both sides of the runway to ignite the fuel at the outlets in the pipes. The burners were sometimes ignited by men on bicycles or by runners on foot. The result was a row of flame along the side of the runway that would warm the air. The heat from the flames evaporated suspended fog droplets so that there would be a clearing in the fog directly over the runway. This allowed the pilot to see the ground as he attempted to put his aircraft down. Once landed, the planes would be moved off and dispersed to hard stands. The next day the planes would be repaired if needed, refueled and flown back to their home base.

The procedure for aircrew before the introduction of FIDO
Before the introduction of FIDO, fog had been responsible for losses of a number of aircraft returning from operations. Often large areas of the UK would be simultaneously fog-bound and it was recommended procedure in these situations for the pilot to point the aircraft towards the sea and then, while still over land, for the crew to bail-out by parachute, leaving the aircraft to subsequently crash in the sea. With raids often consisting of several hundred aircraft, this could amount to a large loss of bombers.

Testing of FIDO 
An experimental FIDO system was first tested at Moody Down, Hampshire, on 4 November 1942 and 200 yards of dense fog was successfully cleared to a height of 80 feet. The first full scale FIDO system was installed in January 1943 and an aircraft reportedly piloted by Air Vice Marshall D. C. T. Bennet successfully landed between the flames, although not in fog conditions.

The first successful flights in fog occurred on 17 July 1943 when an Airspeed Oxford of RAF No 35 Squadron piloted by Flying Officer (later Flight Lieutenant) Edward Noel Holding (RNZAF Number 402185) carried out three approaches and departures in dense fog with Group Captain Basil Robinson. Robinson was killed on operations a month later. Holding survived the war and died in Auckland, New Zealand, in 2008.

The use of FIDO

Over twice this amount was used by airfields with longer runways such as RAF Carnaby. Large fuel storage tanks filled with low-grade petrol and possibly kerosene and other fuel were connected by pumps to provide this fuel to the runway pipes. Although extravagant in the use of fuel consumed, it was felt that the device more than made up for the operating costs involved with the reduction of aircraft losses.

FIDO systems were used at many RAF stations in England during World War II.

The last FIDO-equipped airfield at which a system was maintained was RAF Manston, the system being available for emergency use as late as 1952. Due to the high costs involved, use had to be reported to the Air Minister.

Initial installation of FIDO was designed and constructed along Runway 1 at London Heathrow Airport but the pipes and other fittings were never installed.

FIDO was also installed at North American airfields including Arcata, California, Eareckson Air Station, Naval Air Station Whidbey Island, at the World War II Amchitka Army Airfield on Amchitka Island in the Aleutians.

Applications

RAF
Reference:
 RAF Blackbushe/Hartford Bridge
 RAF Bradwell Bay
 RAF Carnaby – Emergency Landing Ground
 RAF Downham Market, Norfolk
 RAF Fiskerton
 RAF Foulsham
 RAF Graveley
 RAF Ludford Magna
 RAF Manston – Emergency Landing Ground
 RAF Melbourne
 RAF Metheringham
 RAF St Eval
 RAF Sturgate
 RAF Tuddenham
 RAF Woodbridge – Emergency Landing Ground

International
Reference:
 Épinoy - France 
 Arcata-Eureka Airport - California, USA 
 Eareckson Air Station
 Naval Air Station Whidbey Island, Washington, USA 
Amchitka Army Airfield - Amchitka, Aleutians

Gallery

Notes

References

 

FIDO Biography of Reg Miles, RAF Flight Engineer, 432 and 420 Squadrons RCAF, Bomber Command, Justin Museum of Military History.
A description of FIDO is given in Arthur C. Clarke's only non-science-fiction novel Glide Path (1963), about the development of Ground Controlled Approach (GCA) in World War II.

Bibliography

Geoffrey Williams: FLYING THROUGH FIRE. FIDO – The Fogbuster of World War II (Grange Books, London, UK, 1996).

External links

Now It Can Be Told! – 'Operation Fido': Beating Airfield Fog, The War Illustrated, 6 July 1945. thewarillustrated.info
A Lancaster bomber using Fido showing the flames burning alongside the runway

Reactions to Fido – a 1952 Flight article on post-war FIDO operations

 – detailed description with long explanatory inter-titles
 – FIDO at Arcato airfield in the United States of America
 – experiments with FIDO for civilian use
 – a FIDO patent

Fog
Smog
Air pollution in the United Kingdom
World War II military equipment of the United Kingdom
Aerial warfare
British inventions